Morophaga clonodes is a moth of the family Tineidae. It is found in eastern Australia, from Cape York to Sydney.

Adults have a speckled pattern of light and dark greyish-brown on the forewings, and plain brown hindwings.

The larvae tunnel in bracket fungi growing on trees in forests. Pupation takes place in the larval galleries.

External links
Australian Faunal Directory
Moths of Australia
Image
Australian Insects

Moths of Australia
Tineidae
Moths described in 1893